Luc Cyr (born November 21, 1953) is a Canadian prelate of the Roman Catholic Church. He is currently Archbishop of Sherbrooke. Cyr succeeded to this post in September 2011, after serving as Bishop of Valleyfield from June 2001.

Cyr was born in Saint-Jérôme, Quebec, Canada. He was ordained a priest for the Diocese of Saint-Jérôme on August 29, 1980. Cyr was appointed to become Bishop of Valleyfield by Pope John Paul II on  May 10, 2001, and was consecrated June 17, 2001 by Cardinal Turcotte, the then Archbishop of Montréal. Cyr remained bishop of Valleyfield until Pope Benedict XVI appointed him Archbishop of Sherbrooke on July 26, 2011. Cyr was installed September 29, 2011 and received his Pallium June 29, 2012 in St. Peter's Basilica, Rome for the Feast of Saints Peter and Paul. Cyr received his pallium along with Archbishop Christian Lépine, the Archbishop of Montréal, and Paul-André Durocher, Archbishop of Gatineau.

Footnotes

21st-century Roman Catholic archbishops in Canada
People from Saint-Jérôme
1953 births
Living people
French Quebecers
Roman Catholic archbishops of Sherbrooke
Roman Catholic bishops of Valleyfield